UV radiation resistance-associated gene protein is a protein that in humans is encoded by the UVRAG gene.

This gene complements the ultraviolet sensitivity of xeroderma pigmentosum group C cells and encodes a protein with a C2 domain. The protein activates the Beclin1-PI(3)KC3 complex, promoting autophagy and suppressing the proliferation and tumorigenicity of human colon cancer cells. 

Chromosomal aberrations involving this gene are associated with left-right axis malformation and mutations in this gene have been associated with colon cancer.

References

Further reading